Richard Bosom (died c. 1417), of Exeter, Devon, was an English politician.

Family
Bosom married three times. By 1382, he had married Edith, the widow of Warren Bailly of Exeter. By 1398, he had married his second wife, a woman named Felicity. By 1417, he had married a woman named Elizabeth, and had one son.

Career
He was a Member (MP) of the Parliament of England for Exeter in 1381, April 1384, 1386, 1394 and May 1413.

References

14th-century births
1417 deaths
Members of the Parliament of England (pre-1707) for Exeter
English MPs 1381
English MPs April 1384
English MPs 1386
English MPs 1394
English MPs May 1413